Days of Our Lives is the debut studio album by American country music artist James Otto. It was released in 2004 on Mercury Nashville Records, and its title track was a Top 40 hit on the Billboard Hot Country Singles & Tracks (now Hot Country Songs) charts.

Content
The track "The Last Thing I Do" was also recorded by Brooks & Dunn on their 2001 album Steers & Stripes, and by Montgomery Gentry (under the title "If It's the Last Thing I Do") on their 2004 album You Do Your Thing. "Long Way Down" was also recorded by Andy Griggs on his 2008 album The Good Life.

The album was originally slated for a 2003 release, but due to its initial single underperforming on the charts, its release was withheld until 2004.

Critical reception

Robert Loy of Country Standard Time gave the album a mixed review, criticizing derivative lyrics on the title track, "Misspent Youth", "She Knows", and "The Ball", while praising those of "The Violin Song". He also described Otto as having a "nice baritone", while noting the performances on "Gone" and "If It's the Last Thing I Do" in particular. An uncredited review in People was also mixed towards the album's lyrical content, criticizing the title track while complimenting "The Ball" and "Lowdown on the High Life". The same review also noted that "Musically, the bluesier Otto gets, the better he sounds."

Track listing

Personnel
Adapted from Days of Our Lives liner notes.

Musicians
 Bekka Bramlett - background vocals (9)
 Steve Brewster - drums (4)
 Mike Brignardello - bass guitar (all tracks except 6)
 Etta Britt - background vocals (12)
 Pat Buchanan - electric guitar (1, 3–6, 10, 11), baritone guitar (11), electric resonator guitar (11), acoustic guitar (12), lap steel guitar (12)
 Tom Bukovac - electric guitar (all tracks except 6), acoustic guitar (11)
 Vickie Carrico - background vocals (1, 4, 5, 12)
 Eric Darken - percussion (2, 7, 8, 9)
 Daisy Dern - background vocals (11)
 Dan Dugmore - steel guitar (2, 3, 4, 7-11), Dobro (2, 7)
 Shannon Forrest - drums (2, 7, 8, 9), percussion (2, 7)
 Lisa Germano - strings (4)
 Tony Harrell - piano (1, 5)
 Wes Hightower - background vocals (2, 7, 8)
 Rob Ickes - Dobro (6)
 Chuck Leavell - piano (6, 12)
 Ken Lewis - percussion (4, 6, 10, 11, 12)
 B. James Lowry - acoustic guitar (2, 7, 8, 9)
 Brent Mason - electric guitar (7, 8)
 Greg Morrow - drums (1, 3, 5, 6, 10, 11, 12)
 Nashville String Machine - strings (7, 8)
 Steve Nathan - piano (2, 8), Hammond B-3 organ (7, 9), keyboards (9)
 Greg Otarski - tambourine (1, 5)
 James Otto - lead vocals (all tracks), background vocals (1), acoustic guitar (3, 5, 6)
 Caryl Mack Parker - background vocals (1, 4, 5, 6, 12)
 Alison Prestwood - bass guitar (6)
 Chris Stapleton - background vocals (9)
 Bryan Sutton - acoustic guitar (2, 6, 9), mandolin (6, 7, 8), banjo (7)
 Russell Terrell - background vocals (2)
 Dennis Wage - Hammond B-3 organ (1, 3, 4, 5, 10, 11, 12), keyboards (3)
 Jonathan Yudkin - fiddle (6)

String section on Track 6
Darius Campo, Sara Parkins, Michelle Richards, Mark Robertson, John Wittenberg - violins
 Bob Becker, Evan Wilson - violas
 Larry Corbett, Suzie Katayama - cellos

Technical
All tracks except 2, 7, 8, and 9
 Richard Barrow - recording (track 4)
 David Campbell - string arrangements (track 6)
 Steve Churchyard - string recording (track 6)
 Joel Derouin - concertmaster (track 6)
 Adam D. Hatley - assistant, recording
 Dino Herrmann - assistant
 Bryan McConkey - assistant
 Sang Park - assistant
 Scott Parker - producer, recording
 Tom Sweeney - assistant
 Brian David Willis - recording, mixing
 Paul Worley - executive producer

Tracks 2, 7, 8, and 9 only
 Greg Droman - producer, recording, mixing
 Todd Gunnerson - assistant
 Kris Wilkinson - string arrangement (tracks 7, 8)
 Mark Wright - producer

Chart performance

Album

Singles

References

2004 debut albums
Mercury Nashville albums
James Otto albums
Albums produced by Mark Wright (record producer)